"All work and no play makes Jack a dull boy" is a proverb that means without time off from work, a person becomes both bored and boring.

History
Though the spirit of the proverb had been expressed previously, the modern saying first appeared in James Howell's Proverbs (1659). It has often been included in subsequent collections of proverbs and sayings.

Some writers have added a second part to the proverb, as in Harry and Lucy Concluded (1825) by the Irish novelist Maria Edgeworth:

In popular culture
In Stanley Kubrick's film The Shining, the proverb is used to illustrate how the film's central figure, named Jack, has lost his mind when his wife discovers that he procrastinated and had written the sentence over and over again on hundreds of pages with a typewriter. Jack had been aiming to write a theatrical play, but instead wrote this proverb repeatedly using the formatting of the script (including its headings).

In the 1957 film The Bridge on the River Kwai, the phrase is used by a Japanese work camp commander to goad British prisoners about their progress on the eponymous bridge.

Heavy metal band Mudvayne's song "Dull Boy" references the proverb, in both its title and lyrics.

References

English proverbs